Tillandsia compressa is a species in the genus Tillandsia. This species is native to Mexico, Colombia, Central America, and the West Indies.

Cultivars
 Tillandsia 'Casallena'
 Tillandsia 'Cathcart'

References

compressa
Flora of Mexico
Flora of Colombia
Flora of Central America
Flora of the Caribbean
Plants described in 1830
Flora without expected TNC conservation status